Abdallah Magdy is an Egyptian footballer who plays for the Egyptian Premier League side Pyramids as a midfielder.

Biography 
Abdallah Magdy was born on February 22 1997 in Egypt. He played for Misr Lel Makkasa from 2019 to 2021 when he was transferred to Pyramids.

Trophies 
He was in the runner up team that won the 2022 Egyptian Premier League.

References 

 Egyptian Premier League players
Living people
1997 births
Place of birth missing (living people)
Association football midfielders
Pyramids FC players